Grigori Grigoryevich Postanogov (born 27 June 1995) is a Russian football player.

Club career
He made his professional debut in the Russian Football National League for FC Baltika Kaliningrad on 11 July 2015 in a game against FC Shinnik Yaroslavl.

References

External links
 Player page on the FNL website

1995 births
Living people
Russian footballers
FC Baltika Kaliningrad players
Association football forwards
FC Kuban Krasnodar players